Insomnia is a single-movement orchestral composition by the Finnish composer Esa-Pekka Salonen.  The work was composed between March and November 2002 and was first performed on December 1, 2002 by the NHK Symphony Orchestra under Salonen.

Composition
Insomnia has a duration of roughly 20 minutes and is composed in a single movement.

Style and inspiration
Salonen described the piece as "a set of variations based on a harmonic model separated by a Ritornello-like section, which is essentially a pedal point on the note e."  He further described the composition in the score program notes, writing:
Salonen continued:

Instrumentation
The work is scored for an orchestra comprising two flutes (doubling alto flute), piccolo (doubling flute), two oboes, cor anglais, two clarinets (doubling E-flat clarinet and bass clarinet), bass clarinet, two bassoons, contrabassoon, four horns, four Wagner tubas, three trumpets, three trombones, tuba, timpani, four percussionists, harp, piano (doubling celesta), and strings.

Reception
Reviewing the West Coast premiere of Insomnia in San Francisco, Mark Swed of the Los Angeles Times called the piece "newsworthy" and wrote, "Written in the aftermath of 9/11 and first performed in Tokyo at the end of 2002, it is more darkly tinted than his typically bright orchestral music. The unusual incorporation of four Wagner tubas gives the overall sound a dusky mass."  He added, "But what is truly extraordinary about the 22-minute score is the way it grips attention. Insomnia is not, for most people, a pleasurable sensation. Here, though, it is, as Salonen, through an exceptional command of a large orchestra, explores the more distant and sometimes ecstatic reaches of the involuntarily alert mind."  Stephen Johnson of BBC Music Magazine also praised the work, writing:

Arnold Whittall of Gramophone was more critical, however, remarking, "The 21-minute, single-movement work Insomnia displays a similar lack of differentiation, the great washes of sound more effective in keeping a large orchestra busy than in promoting a persuasive musical argument."

References

Compositions by Esa-Pekka Salonen
2002 compositions
Compositions for symphony orchestra